The 2017 Piala Tun Sharifah Rodziah is the 30th edition of Piala Tun Sharifah Rodziah a women's football tournament organised by Football Association of Malaysia. The defending champions is MISC. Sarawak for the first time hosted the women's football tournament and it took place in several venues around city of Miri. Sarawak defeated Kedah in the final to win their first Piala Tun Sharifah Rodziah title.

The tournament offers prize money of RM20,000, a trophy and 25 gold medals to the winner, while the runner-up RM 10,000 and 25 silver medals and third place RM 5,000 and 25 bronze.

Venues
 Stadium Terbuka Miri (Miri Stadium)
 Padang Institut Kemahiran Belia Negara (IKBN) (National Youth Skills Institute Field)
 Padang Kelab Rekreasi dan Petroliam (KRP) Lutong (Recreation Club and Petroleum Field)

Teams
12 teams participated in the latest edition of the tournament where the teams were divided into three groups. The winners, runners-up and the best two third-placed teams advance to the quarterfinals.

Round and draw dates
The draw for the group stage was held on 22 March 2017, 11:30 MYT (UTC+8), at the Wisma FAM in Petaling Jaya, Malaysia.

Groups

Group A

Group B

Group C

Ranking of third-placed teams

Knockout stage

Bracket

Quarterfinals

Semifinals

Third place

Final

Champions

References

External links
 Official website

Football cup competitions in Malaysia
Women's football in Malaysia